Sarah Child (d. 1793) was a British banker. 

She was daughter of Gilbert Jodrell of Ankerwyke, Buckinghamshire. She married Robert Child (Wells MP), and became the mother of Sarah Fane, Countess of Westmorland. 

On the death of her spouse in 1782, she inherited the position of nominal head of the major bank Child & Co., which was not a common position for a woman in Great Britain in the 18th century. 

After her death, her position in the bank was inherited by her granddaughter Sarah Villiers, Countess of Jersey.

References 

 Margaret Dawes, Nesta Selwyn: Women Who Made Money: Women Partners in British Private Banks 1752–1906

18th-century births
1793 deaths
British women bankers
18th-century English businesspeople
18th-century English businesswomen
English bankers